Andrew Roy may refer to:

Andrew Roy (actor), or Drew Roy
Andrew Roy (sailor), in Laser World Championships
Andrew Roy (figure skater) in Australian Figure Skating Championships
Andrew Roy (mining inspector) (1880s), Ohio State Inspector of Mines, founder of Glen Roy, Ohio

See also